Gavin Brown is a Canadian record producer,

Discography

Gold and Platinum awards

Grammy Awards nominations
 Best Compilation Soundtrack Album for Motion Picture, Television or Other Visual Media for The Twilight Saga: Eclipse featuring "Eclipse (All Yours)" by Metric — 52nd Annual Grammy Awards (2010)

JUNO Awards and nominations

References

Canadian record producers
Canadian songwriters
Canadian rock musicians
Rock songwriters
Jack Richardson Producer of the Year Award winners
Living people
Year of birth missing (living people)